Nebra may refer to:

Places
 Nebra (Unstrut), a town in the state of Saxony-Anhalt, Germany
 Nebra (Spain), a parish in the municipality of Porto do Son, province of A Coruña, Galicia, Spain

People
 Nebra (Pharaoh), Ancient Egyptian King of the Second Dynasty
 Manuel Blasco de Nebra, Spanish composer from Seville
 José de Nebra, Spanish composer from Cuenca

Other uses
 Nebra sky disk, ancient bronze disk from Germany
 Nebra Ltd, a company providing IoT and consumer electronics products